The Sun Fast 39 is a French sailboat that was designed by Jacques Fauroux as a racer-cruiser and first built in 1989.

The Sun Fast 39 is a development of the more cruising-oriented Sun Charm 39 of 1988. The design was developed into the cruising Sun Odyssey 39 in 1990.

Production
The design was built by Jeanneau in France, starting in 1989, but it is now out of production.

Design
The Sun Fast 39 is a racing keelboat, built predominantly of fiberglass, with wood trim. It has a fractional sloop rig. The hull has a raked stem, a step-down reverse transom with a swimming platform, an internally mounted spade-type rudder controlled by a wheel and a fixed fin keel. It displaces  and carries  of ballast.

The boat is fitted with a British inboard engine for docking and maneuvering.

The design has sleeping accommodation for six people, with a double "V"-berth in the bow cabin and two aft cabins with a double berth in each. The galley is located on the starboard side, amidships and opposite the "U" shaped settee and the dining table. The galley is equipped with a two-burner stove, an ice box and a double sink. A navigation station is aft of the galley, on the starboard side. There are two heads, one just forward of each aft cabin.

See also
List of sailing boat types

References

External links

Sun Fast 39 video tour

Keelboats
1980s sailboat type designs
Sailing yachts
Sailboat type designs by Jacques Fauroux
Sailboat types built by Jeanneau